Bertaut Reef is an island in Seychelles, lying in the Outer Islands of Seychelles, with a distance of  south of Victoria, Seychelles.

Geography
It covers an area in excess of 20 km2. Only in the south and southeast waves break over a shallow reef edge. Bertaut Reef has a small uninhabited and unvegetated sand cay on its southern part, with an area of about 3000 m2. The reef is steep and the sea breaks heavily over its edge.

Administration
The island belongs to Outer Islands District.

Image gallery

References

External links 

 2010 Sailing directions

Islands of Outer Islands (Seychelles)
Uninhabited islands of Seychelles
Reefs of the Indian Ocean